This list of Nepenthes natural hybrids is a comprehensive listing of all recorded natural hybrids involving species of the carnivorous plant genus Nepenthes. Hybrids that are not endemic to a given region are marked with an asterisk.

Named natural hybrids

By distribution

Borneo

Nepenthes natural hybrids recorded from Borneo.

 N. albomarginata × N. ampullaria *
? N. albomarginata × N. chaniana
 N. albomarginata × N. clipeata
 N. albomarginata × N. hirsuta
 N. albomarginata × N. macrovulgaris
 N. albomarginata × N. northiana [=N. × cincta]
 N. albomarginata × N. rafflesiana
 N. albomarginata × N. reinwardtiana [=N. × ferrugineomarginata] *
 N. albomarginata × N. veitchii
 N. ampullaria × N. bicalcarata
 N. ampullaria × N. gracilis [=N. × trichocarpa] *
 (N. ampullaria × N. gracilis) × N. bicalcarata [=N. × trichocarpa × N. bicalcarata]
 N. ampullaria × N. hemsleyana
 N. ampullaria × N. hirsuta
 N. ampullaria × N. mirabilis [=N. × kuchingensis, Nepenthes cutinensis] *
 N. ampullaria × N. rafflesiana [=N. × hookeriana] *
? (N. ampullaria × N. rafflesiana) × N. mirabilis [=N. × hookeriana × N. mirabilis]
 N. bicalcarata × N. gracilis [=N. × cantleyi]
 N. bicalcarata × N. mirabilis (including N. bicalcarata × N. mirabilis var. echinostoma)
 N. bicalcarata × N. rafflesiana
 ? (N. bicalcarata × N. rafflesiana) × N. mirabilis var. echinostoma
 N. burbidgeae × N. edwardsiana
 N. burbidgeae × N. fusca
 N. burbidgeae × N. rajah [=N. × alisaputrana]
 N. burbidgeae × N. tentaculata
 N. chaniana × N. veitchii
 N. clipeata × N. rafflesiana
 N. clipeata × N. reinwardtiana
 N. edwardsiana × N. rajah
 N. edwardsiana × N. villosa [=N. × harryana]
 ? N. faizaliana × N. veitchii
 N. fusca × N. lowii
 N. fusca × N. platychila
 N. fusca × N. rajah
 N. fusca × N. reinwardtiana [=?N. naquiyuddinii]
 N. fusca × N. stenophylla
 N. fusca × N. tentaculata
 N. fusca × N. veitchii
 N. gracilis × N. mirabilis [=N. × sharifah-hapsahii, N. × ghazallyana, N. × grabilis, N. neglecta?] * (including N. gracilis × N. mirabilis var. echinostoma)
 N. gracilis × N. northiana [=N. × bauensis]
 N. gracilis × N. rafflesiana *
 N. gracilis × N. reinwardtiana *
 N. hemsleyana × N. rafflesiana
 ? N. hirsuta × N. lowii
 N. hispida × N. reinwardtiana
 N. hurrelliana × N. lowii
 N. hurrelliana × N. veitchii
 N. lowii × N. macrophylla [=N. × trusmadiensis]
 N. lowii × N. muluensis
 N. lowii × N. rajah
 N. lowii × N. stenophylla
 ? N. lowii × N. tentaculata
 N. lowii × N. veitchii
 N. macrovulgaris × N. rajah
 N. macrovulgaris × N. reinwartdiana
 N. macrovulgaris × N. tentaculata
 N. mirabilis × N. northiana
 N. mirabilis × N. rafflesiana * (including N. mirabilis var. echinostoma × N. rafflesiana)
 N. mirabilis × N. reinwardtiana
 ? N. muluensis × N. tentaculata [=N. × sarawakiensis, ?N. muluensis]
 N. rajah × N. stenophylla
 N. rajah × N. tentaculata
 N. rajah × N. villosa [=N × kinabaluensis]
 N. reinwardtiana × N. stenophylla
 N. reinwardtiana × N. tentaculata
 N. stenophylla × N. tentaculata
 N. stenophylla × N. veitchii

Endemic species with no known natural hybrids:
 N. appendiculata
 N. boschiana
 N. campanulata
 N. ephippiata
 N. epiphytica
 N. glandulifera
 N. mapuluensis
 N. mollis
 N. murudensis
 N. pilosa
 N. vogelii

Nepenthes hurrelliana and N. murudensis are of putative hybrid origin, but are considered species by most taxonomists, as they form stable, fertile populations independent of their original parent species. The same could be said for stable hybrids such as N × kinabaluensis. Indeed, species status has been proposed for this taxon in the past.

Sumatra

Nepenthes natural hybrids recorded from Sumatra.

 N. albomarginata × N. ampullaria *
 N. albomarginata × N. eustachya
 N. albomarginata × N. reinwardtiana [=N. × ferrugineomarginata] *
N. ampullaria × N. eustachya
 N. ampullaria × N. gracilis [=N. × trichocarpa] *
 N. ampullaria × N. mirabilis [=N. × kuchingensis, Nepenthes cutinensis] *
 N. ampullaria × N. rafflesiana [=N. × hookeriana] *
 N. ampullaria × N. reinwardtiana
 N. ampullaria × N. spathulata
 N. ampullaria × N. tobaica
 N. angasanensis × N. densiflora
 N. aristolochioides × N. singalana
 ? N. beccariana × N. sumatrana
 N. bongso × N. gymnamphora
 N. bongso × N. singalana
 N. bongso × N. talangensis
 N. diatas × N. mikei
 N. dubia × N. izumiae
? N. dubia × N. jacquelineae
? N. dubia × N. jamban
? N. eustachya × N. gracilis
 N. eustachya × N. longifolia
 N. eustachya × N. sumatrana
 N. flava × N. ovata
 N. flava × N. rhombicaulis
 N. gracilis × N. mirabilis [=N. × sharifah-hapsahii, N. × ghazallyana, N. × grabilis, N. neglecta?] *
 N. gracilis × N. rafflesiana *
 N. gracilis × N. reinwardtiana *
 N. gracilis × N. sumatrana
 N. gymnamphora × N. mikei [=N. × pangulubauensis]
 N. gymnamphora × N. ovata
 N. gymnamphora × N. reinwardtiana
 ? N. gymnamphora × N. rhombicaulis
 N. gymnamphora × N. singalana
 N. gymnamphora × N. spathulata
 N. gymnamphora × N. spectabilis
 N. gymnamphora × N. talangensis
 N. inermis × N. singalana
 N. inermis × N. spathulata
 N. inermis × N. talangensis [=N. × pyriformis]
 N. izumiae × N. jacquelineae
 N. jamban × N. lingulata
 ? N. longifolia × N. sumatrana
 N. mikei × N. ovata
 N. mikei × N. spectabilis
 N. mirabilis × N. rafflesiana *
 N. mirabilis × N. spathulata
 N. mirabilis × N. sumatrana
 N. ovata × N. rhombicaulis
 N. ovata × N. spectabilis
 N. reinwardtiana × N. spathulata
 N. reinwardtiana × N. tobaica
 N. rhombicaulis × N. spectabilis
 N. rhombicaulis × N. tobaica
 N. rigidifolia × N. spectabilis
 ? N. singalana × N. spathulata
 N. spathulata × N. tobaica
 N. spectabilis × N. tobaica

Endemic species with no known natural hybrids:
 N. adnata
 N. junghuhnii
 N. lavicola
 N. naga
 N. tenuis

Philippines

Nepenthes natural hybrids recorded from the Philippines. The N. alata hybrids listed below involve N. alata in the broad sense (sensu lato); this polymorphic taxon has recently been split into a large number of daughter species that now form the so-called "N. alata group".

 N. alata × N. burkei
 N. alata × N. merrilliana [=N. × merrilliata]
 ? (N. alata × N. merrilliana) × N. mirabilis [=N. × tsangoya]
 N. alata × N. mindanaoensis
 N. alata × N. mirabilis [=N. × mirabilata]
 ? N. alata × N. petiolata
 N. alata × N. pulchra
 N. alata × N. truncata [=N. × truncalata]
 N. alata × N. ventricosa [=N. × ventrata]
 ? N. pantaronensis × N. sumagaya
 N. bellii × N. merrilliana
 N. bellii × N. mindanaoensis
 N. ceciliae × N. pulchra
 N. merrilliana× N. mindanaoensis
 N. merrilliana × N. mirabilis
 N. mindanaoensis × N. truncata
N. mindanaoensis × N. erucoides
 N. palawanensis × N. aff. philippinensis ? N. petiolata × N. truncataIn addition, certain plants from Mount Hamiguitan are likely to represent crosses involving N. hamiguitanensis, N. justinae (previously identified as N. mindanaoensis), N. micramphora, and N. peltata.

Endemic species with no known natural hybrids:

 N. abalata N. abgracilis N. aenigma N. alzapan N. argentii N. armin N. attenboroughii N. barcelonae N. cid N. copelandii N. cornuta N. deaniana N. extincta N. gantungensis N. graciliflora N. halmahera N. kitanglad N. leonardoi N. leyte N. mantalingajanensis N. mira N. negros N. philippinensis N. ramos N. robcantleyi N. samar N. saranganiensis N. sibuyanensis N. surigaoensis N. talaandig N. tboli N. ultra N. viridis N. weda N. zygon N. sp. AnipahanNepenthes petiolata may itself have evolved from a cross between N. alata and N. truncata. It has been suggested that N. extincta might represent a natural hybrid between N. merrilliana and N. mindanaoensis, as both of these species grow near the type locality of N. extincta and share many morphological features with it.

Plants from Mount Hamiguitan that were originally thought to represent the natural hybrid N. micramphora × N. peltata are now recognised as belonging to a distinct species of possible hybridogenic origin, N. hamiguitanensis.

Peninsular Malaysia and SingaporeNepenthes natural hybrids recorded from Peninsular Malaysia and Singapore.

 N. albomarginata × N. ampullaria *
 N. albomarginata × N. gracilis? N. albomarginata × N. sanguineaShivas, R.G. 1985.   Carnivorous Plant Newsletter 14(1): 13–14.
 N. ampullaria × N. gracilis [=N. × trichocarpa] *
 N. ampullaria × N. mirabilis [=N. × kuchingensis, Nepenthes cutinensis] *
 N. ampullaria × N. rafflesiana [=N. × hookeriana] *
 N. benstonei × N. mirabilis N. gracilis × N. mirabilis  [=N. × sharifah-hapsahii, N. × ghazallyana, N. × grabilis, N. neglecta?] *
 N. macfarlanei × N. ramispina N. macfarlanei × N. sanguinea N. mirabilis × N. rafflesiana *
 N. ramispina × N. sanguineaTwo natural hybrids have been recorded from Singapore: N. × hookeriana and N. × trichocarpa. As such, all three species from Singapore are known to hybridise.

SulawesiNepenthes natural hybrids recorded from Sulawesi.

 ? N. eymae × N. maxima N. glabrata × N. hamataLee, C.C. 2006. Sulawesi Photographs . Carnivorous Plants in the tropics.
 N. glabrata × N. maxima N. glabrata × N. nigra N. glabrata × N. tentaculata N. hamata × N. tentaculata N. maxima × N. tentaculata N. mirabilis × N. tomoriana N. nigra × N. tentaculata N. pitopangii × N. tentaculataEndemic species with no known natural hybrids:
 N. diabolica N. maryae N. undulatifoliaIndochinaNepenthes natural hybrids recorded from Indochina. For the purpose of this list, the area encompasses Cambodia, Laos, Myanmar, Thailand, and Vietnam.

 N. ampullaria × N. gracilis [=N. × trichocarpa] *
 N. ampullaria × N. mirabilis [=N. × kuchingensis, Nepenthes cutinensis] *
 N. andamana × N. mirabilis (including N. andamana × N. mirabilis var. globosa)
 N. bokorensis × N. kampotiana N. gracilis × N. mirabilis [=N. × sharifah-hapsahii, N. × ghazallyana, N. × grabilis, N. neglecta?] *
 N. kampotiana × N. mirabilis N. kongkandana × N. mirabilis N. mirabilis × N. smilesii N. mirabilis × N. thoreliiBednar, B. 1983.   Carnivorous Plant Newsletter 12(3): 64.

In addition, infraspecific hybrids between N. mirabilis var. globosa and N. mirabilis var. mirabilis are known to occur.

Endemic species with no known natural hybrids:
 N. bokorensis N. chang N. holdenii N. kerrii N. rosea N. suratensis N. thaiNew Guinea and the Maluku IslandsNepenthes natural hybrids recorded from New Guinea, the Maluku Islands, and surrounding islands.

 N. ampullaria × N. mirabilis [=N. × kuchingensis, Nepenthes cutinensis] *
 N. ampullaria × N. neoguineensis N. insignis × N. mirabilis N. klossii × N. maxima N. maxima × N. neoguineensis ? N. paniculata × N. papuanaEndemic species with no known natural hybrids:
 N. biak N. danseri N. lamii N. monticola N. treubiana N. sp. Misool

AustraliaNepenthes natural hybrids recorded from Australia. 
  
 N. mirabilis × N. rowaniae N. mirabilis × N. tenax N. rowaniae × N. tenaxComplex hybrids involving all three species are also common.

All three species from Australia are known to hybridise.

Outlying areas
There are six additional species endemic to areas other than those listed above. These are:

 N. distillatoria (Sri Lanka)
 N. khasiana (India)
 N. madagascariensis (Madagascar)
 N. masoalensis (Madagascar)
 N. pervillei (Seychelles)
 N. vieillardii (New Caledonia)

Of these, the only species that could conceivably hybridise in the wild are N. madagascariensis and N. masoalensis. Although the ranges of the two species used to meet near Cape Masoala, no natural hybrids have ever been recorded.

See also
 List of Nepenthes species
 List of Nepenthes species by distribution

Notes

a.Identified as N. pilosa × N. veitchii in Nepenthes of Borneo.
b.Identified as N. lowii × N. pilosa in Nepenthes of Borneo.
c.Identified as N. dubia × N. singalana in Nepenthes of Sumatra and Peninsular Malaysia.
d.Identified as N. spectabilis × N. species A in Nepenthes of Sumatra and Peninsular Malaysia''.

References

 
Nepenthes05 Natural hybrids